Metacrangon is a genus of shrimp belonging to the family Crangonidae.

The genus has cosmopolitan distribution.

Species

Species:

Metacrangon acclivis 
Metacrangon agassizii 
Metacrangon asiaticus

References

Decapod genera
Crangonidae